Sydney Thompson (born 1892) was an English footballer who played as a centre half.

Career
Thompson began his career at Wallsend Park Villa. He joined Bradford City in March 1911, making 1 league appearance for the club, before moving to Luton Town in July 1912. He later played for Pontypridd.

Sources

References

1892 births
Date of death missing
English footballers
Bradford City A.F.C. players
Luton Town F.C. players
Pontypridd F.C. players
English Football League players
Association football defenders